San Antonio (General Juan Facundo Quiroga) is a municipality and village within the General Juan Facundo Quiroga Department of La Rioja Province in northwestern Argentina.

References

Populated places in La Rioja Province, Argentina